Rutter's is a chain of convenience stores and gas stations with 83 locations in Central and Western Pennsylvania, the Eastern Panhandle of West Virginia, and central Maryland.  Stores are open 24 hours a day and have a made-to-order food counter, staffed around the clock.

History

The company began agricultural operations in 1747. In 1921, Rutter's started a dairy company. The first Rutter's Farm Stores opened on February 22, 1968. In 2018, the company shortened its name from "Rutter's Farm Stores" to "Rutter's". The first location outside of Pennsylvania opened on May 30, 2018 in Inwood, West Virginia. On January 15, 2019, Rutter's opened its first Maryland location in Walkersville.

On February 13, 2020, Rutter's announced that a data breach had occurred at its locations between October 1, 2018 and May 29, 2019, with malware installed on payment systems inside the store and at the gas pumps.

In December 2022, Rutter's announced plans for two locations in Monroeville at the former Toys R' Us location off U.S 22 William Penn Hwy, and at a former Family Dollar location on U.S 286 in Plum Boro, suburban areas outside of Pittsburgh. 

In January 2023, Rutter's announced plans to open 50 new stores over the next five years. New stores will include additional locations in Pennsylvania (expanding outside of Central Pennsylvania with stores from Philadelphia to Pittsburgh and north of Altoona), Maryland, and West Virginia along with the first locations in Delaware and Virginia.

Food service
Rutter's deli offers various sandwiches, salads, hot and prepared foods as well as a breakfast menu.

Alcohol sales
Several Rutter's locations in Central Pennsylvania along with the Inwood, West Virginia location sell beer and wine. The Inwood, West Virginia location also sells liquor; liquor cannot be sold at its Pennsylvania locations as all liquor in Pennsylvania must be sold at state-owned Fine Wine & Good Spirits stores. Locations selling alcohol also feature a seating area. Rutter's has been rapidly adding Beer Caves to its Pennsylvania locations since Act 39 in 2016 allowed for additional alcohol licenses in Pennsylvania.

Video gaming rooms
Following the 2017 passage of a Pennsylvania law that allows up to five video gaming terminals to be located at "truck stop establishments", Rutter's and Penn National Gaming opened the first video gaming room at the Rutter's location in Manchester Township in York County in August 2019. There are plans to open video gaming rooms at more Rutter's locations in 2019 and 2020.

Rutter's Beverage Company
Rutter's Beverage Company sells products throughout Pennsylvania, Maryland, New Jersey, and West Virginia.

References

External links

Convenience stores of the United States
Gas stations in the United States
Companies based in York County, Pennsylvania
American companies established in 1968
Retail companies established in 1968
1968 establishments in Pennsylvania
Privately held companies based in Pennsylvania
York, Pennsylvania